On December 5, 2019, a police pursuit of jewelry store robbers in Miramar, Florida, United States, culminated in a shootout, killing the perpetrators, the kidnapped driver of a UPS van (which they had carjacked), and a bystander. The crime scene was described as "very complicated" by the FBI special agent in charge. The president of Miami-Dade's police union claimed that at least eleven officers opened fire on the UPS truck in response to the robbers' firing first.

Robbery
At approximately 4:14 p.m., Lamar Alexander and Ronnie Jerome Hill robbed the jewelry store, Regent Jeweler at Miracle Mile in Coral Gables, Florida. They held the store's cashier at gunpoint and stole diamonds. The two suspects exchanged gunfire with the store owner during the robbery, injuring one jewelry shop worker and hitting nearby Coral Gables City Hall with a stray bullet, causing that building to be placed on lock down.

Police were alerted when the store's silent alarm system went off. Ninety seconds later, when officers arrived, the gunmen opened fire on the officers, who then returned fire on the gunmen. The gunmen left in a U-Haul van, which they later ditched in a suburban neighborhood one mile away. The suspects then carjacked a UPS delivery truck at gunpoint and took the driver hostage. The two continued their escape in the UPS truck, heading on Interstate 75 into Broward County.

Shootout
Police then took cover behind the cars containing bystanders and later claimed the suspects opened fire first however, the lawyer representing the two innocent victims of the shooting cites witness testimony that the police shot first. A total of nineteen officers fired at the suspects, including thirteen members of the Miami-Dade Police Department. The other six officers were from the Miramar Police Department and the Pembroke Pines Police Department. The pursuit and shootout were broadcast live on television by news helicopters.

Victims

Four people were killed in the shootout. Both robbery suspects,  Lamar Alexander, and Ronnie Jerome Hill, both 41, were killed by police. The hijacked UPS driver, Frank Ordonez, 27, and bystander Richard Cutshaw, 70, were also both killed in the shootout; the Florida Department of Law Enforcement has not released the result of ballistics investigations that would indicate whether Ordonez and Cutshaw were shot by police or robbers. A female store employee was shot and wounded in the initial robbery.

Response

The sister of Ordonez, who had been taken hostage, expressed her anger that the police responded quickly with gunfire, and did not attempt to negotiate the hostage situation, which she believed caused her brother's death.
At a vigil the following year, Ordonez's brother said "The police murdered my brother on live TV and we all had to watch in horror." Lawsuits were later filed on behalf of Ordonez and Cutshaw, alleging that the police agencies involved had behaved negligently. The litigation stalled due to the COVID-19 pandemic. Florida Department of Law Enforcement finished their investigation on Sept 17, 2021, and turned it over to  the Broward state attorney’s office.

See also
 1986 FBI Miami shootout
 North Hollywood shootout

References

2019 in Florida
2010s crimes in Florida
Coral Gables, Florida
Deaths by firearm in Florida
Criminal duos
December 2019 crimes in the United States
Filmed killings by law enforcement
Killings by law enforcement officers in the United States
Law enforcement operations in the United States
Miramar, Florida
Robberies in the United States
United Parcel Service
Law enforcement in Florida